Gastone Baldi (born 14 May 1901 – 18 June 1971) was an Italian footballer who played as a midfielder.

Career
Baldi played for 4 seasons (82 games, 3 goals) in the Italian Serie A with Bologna F.C. 1909. Baldi made his debut for the Italy national football team on 3 December 1922 in a game against Switzerland. He represented Italy at the 1924 Summer Olympics.

References

External links
 

1901 births
1971 deaths
Italian footballers
Bologna F.C. 1909 players
Italy international footballers
Serie A players
Footballers at the 1924 Summer Olympics
Olympic footballers of Italy
Association football midfielders